Verneuil-sur-Vienne (literally Verneuil on Vienne;  or ) is a commune in the French department of Haute-Vienne and the region of New Aquitaine, western France.
It is home of one of the last vineyards in Haute-Vienne.

Inhabitants are known as Verneuillais.

See also
Communes of the Haute-Vienne department

References

Communes of Haute-Vienne